Agency debt, also known as an Agency bond or Agency Security, is a security, usually a bond, issued by a United States government-sponsored agency or federal budget agency. The offerings of these agencies are backed but not guaranteed by the US government. Some prominent issuers of these securities are the Federal Home Loan Banks (FHLBanks), Federal National Mortgage Association (Fannie Mae) and Federal Home Loan Mortgage Corporation (Freddie Mac).

See also
Mortgage-backed security

References

Securities (finance)
Bonds (finance)